"37 Stitches" is a song by American rock band Drowning Pool and the third single from their third studio album Full Circle. It was Drowning Pool's first-ever top 5 hit on the Billboard Hot Mainstream Rock Tracks chart and was available for free in the iPhone OS application Tap Tap Revenge 2. It was the first song to appear on the Rock Songs chart, peaking at number 42.

With its echoed guitar and clean vocals, "37 Stitches" has an overall mellow and moody atmosphere compared to previous singles. Possibly referring to the song, the drummer Mike Luce said in an interview, "We have got some old school typical Drowning Pool high energy music. But then you got some more mainstream Alice In Chains acoustic rock".

Number 37 is an homage to Ryan McCombs' father. Ryan McCombs said in an interview, "I wrote the song 37 Stitches back when I was in Drowning Pool, and it was kinda an homage to my dad. When I was growing up, everything was always 37. 'How much farther? 37 miles.' 'How old do you think he is? He's 37 years old.' This is my dad's number, yeah."

Track listing

Charts

References

2007 songs
2008 singles
Drowning Pool songs
Eleven Seven Label Group singles
Rock ballads
Songs written by Stevie Benton
Songs written by Ryan McCombs